Rui Andrade may refer to:
 Rui Andrade (footballer)
 Rui Andrade (racing driver)